A Love to Last is a 2017 Philippine romantic, family drama television series directed by Jerry Lopez-Sineneng, starring Bea Alonzo, Ian Veneracion, and Iza Calzado with an ensemble cast. The series premiered on ABS-CBN's Primetime Bida evening block and worldwide on The Filipino Channel from January 9, 2017 to September 22, 2017 replacing Magpahanggang Wakas.

Series overview

List of episodes

Chapter 1

Chapter 2

References

Lists of Philippine drama television series episodes